The following is a list of notable alumni of IMG Academy in Bradenton, Florida. Founded in 1978, the academy trains thousands of youth, high school, collegiate and professional athletes annually. Many of the alumni listed below did not attend or graduate from IMG Academy, but participated in training there.

American football
 Andre Cisco, defensive back
 Marc Colombo, offensive tackle and coach
 Angelo Crowell, linebacker
 Grant Delpit, safety
 Daniel Faalele, offensive tackle
 Deondre Francois, quarterback
 Hjalte Froholdt, offensive guard
 K. J. Hamler, wide receiver
 Mike Jenkins, former cornerback
 Chris Kelsay, defensive end
 Josh Lambo, kicker
 Dylan Moses, linebacker
 Kellen Mond, quarterback
 Evan Neal, offensive tackle
 Greg Newsome II, cornerback
 K. J. Osborn, wide receiver
 Shea Patterson, quarterback
 Sammis Reyes, Chilean-born tight end and basketball player 
 Bo Scarbrough, running back
 Nolan Smith, edge rusher
 Tyree St. Louis, offensive tackle
 Kenyatta Walker, offensive tackle
 Fabian Washington, cornerback
 Anthony Weaver, defensive end
 Grant Wistrom, defensive end

Baseball
 IMG Academy High School 
  Brady Aiken, drafted by Houston Astros as first pick of 2014 MLB Draft, but did not sign; 17th pick of 2015 MLB Draft by Cleveland Indians
  Logan Allen, drafted by Boston Red Sox in 2015 MLB Draft, traded in deal for Craig Kimbrel, debuted for the San Diego Padres in 2019.
  Alfredo L. Escalera, selected by Kansas City Royals as youngest player drafted in Major League history
  L. J. Mazzilli, drafted by New York Mets in 2013
  John Ryan Murphy, drafted by New York Yankees in round 2 of 2009 MLB draft
  Tyler Pastornicky, drafted by Toronto Blue Jays in 2008
  Chris Perez, drafted by St. Louis Cardinals in 2008, All-Star in 2011 and 2012

 Professional training program alumni
  Pedro Álvarez, 2010 National League Rookie of the Month for September; third baseman for Baltimore Orioles 
  Pat Burrell, two-time World Series champion and Golden Spikes Award recipient
  Ian Desmond, 2012 and 2016 All-Star, 3-time Silver Slugger Award recipient
  Adam Dunn, two-time MLB All-Star; played with Cincinnati Reds, Washington Nationals, Arizona Diamondbacks, Chicago White Sox, and Oakland Athletics
  Josh Hamilton, five-time MLB All-Star and 2010 AL Most Valuable Player
  Kyle Kendrick, pitcher for Philadelphia Phillies, won a World Series championship with the organization in 2008
  Joe Mauer, five-time MLB All-Star, three-time AL batting champion, three-time Gold Glove Award winner and four-time Silver Slugger award winner for Minnesota Twins, AL MVP (2009)
  Andrew McCutchen, five-time All-Star, Gold Glove Award (2012), Silver Slugger Award (2012) and National League Most Outstanding Player (2012) for Pittsburgh Pirates, NL MVP (2013)
  Jamie Moyer, MLB pitcher, 26-year career, selected to All-Star team in 2003; received Roberto Clemente and Lou Gehrig Awards
  Gary Sheffield, nine-time MLB All-Star, 1997 World Series champion, five-time Silver Slugger Award winner and 1992 Comeback Player of the Year
  Joey Votto, MLB first baseman, 5-time All-Star, winner of 2010 National League MVP award, Hank Aaron Award, and Lou Marsh Trophy as Canada's athlete of the year
  Neil Walker, MLB infielder, 2010 Baseball America's All-Rookie Team
  Vernon Wells, MLB outfielder, three-time All-Star, three-time Gold Glove Award recipient and Silver Slugger Award winner
  Ryan Zimmerman, MLB first baseman, two-time All-Star, Gold Glove Award recipient, and Lou Gehrig Memorial Award winner
  Jose Ramirez, MLB infielder, two-time All-Star, two-time Silver Slugger Award Winner, 3rd place AL MVP Finalist 2018

Basketball
  Renaldo Balkman, former forward for New York Knicks
  Dwayne Bacon, shooting guard for Orlando Magic, formerly of Charlotte Hornets.
  Michael Beasley, forward for Los Angeles Lakers; formerly of New York Knicks, Milwaukee Bucks, Miami Heat, Minnesota Timberwolves and Phoenix Suns, as well as Shanghai Sharks and Shandong Golden Stars in China
  Satnam Singh Bhamara, former center for Texas Legends; first Indian selected in NBA draft (selected by Dallas Mavericks), debuted as a professional wrestler in 2022
  Ramel Bradley, player for Hapoel Holon in Israeli Super League
  Earl Clark, power forward for Anyang KGC.
  Erick Dampier, former professional basketball player for Indiana Pacers, Golden State Warriors, Atlanta Hawks, Dallas Mavericks, Miami Heat.
  DeAndre Daniels, professional basketball player. College player at UConn
  Trevon Duval, point guard who went undrafted in the 2018 NBA Draft, was then signed by Milwaukee Bucks on a two-way contract.
  Taurean Green, professional basketball player; drafted in 2nd round (52nd overall) in 2007 by Portland Trail Blazers; also played for Denver Nuggets
  Jonathan Isaac, forward for Orlando Magic
  Kenny Kadji (born 1988), Cameroonian basketball player in the Israeli Basketball Premier League
  Kenyon Martin Jr., son of Kenyon Martin, forward for the Houston Rockets
 Mangok Mathiang (born 1992), Australian-Sudanese basketball player for Hapoel Eilat of the Israeli Basketball Premier League
  Dwight Powell, forward for Dallas Mavericks
  Ricky Sanchez, selected in 2nd round of 2005 NBA Draft by Denver Nuggets; played for Santurce Crabbers of National Superior Basketball League of Puerto Rico
  Anfernee Simons, drafted 24th overall in the 2018 NBA Draft directly out of high school, winner of the 2021 NBA Dunk Contest
  Romello White (born 1998), power forward for Hapoel Eilat of the Israeli Basketball Premier League
  Jaden Springer, Shooting Guard for Philadelphia 76ers
 Josh Green, Shooting Guard for Dallas Mavericks

Golf

  Laetitia Beck
  Nelly Korda

Lacrosse
 Tehoka Nanticoke
 Chase Scanlan
 Cody Gross
 Jordan Scherer
 Nate Ashley
 Zayda Fredricks
 Maddy Manahan

IMG Bollettieri Tennis Academy

 Men's tennis

  Andre Agassi
  Paul Annacone
  Jimmy Arias
  Pablo Arraya
  Younes El Aynaoui
  Boris Becker
  Philip Bester
  Björn Borg
  Jim Courier
  Taylor Edgar
  Thomas Enqvist
  Brian Gottfried
  Tommy Haas
  Mauricio Hadad
  Ryan Harrison

  Mark Knowles
  Aaron Krickstein
  Jesse Levine
  Xavier Malisse
  Paul-Henri Mathieu
  Tim Mayotte
  Max Mirnyi
  Kei Nishikori
  Yoshihito Nishioka
  Nicolás Pereira
  Mark Philippoussis
  Marcelo Ríos
  Greg Rusedski
  André Sá
  Pete Sampras
  David Wheaton

 Women's tennis

  Carling Bassett-Seguso
  Lisa Bonder
  Sandra Cacic
  Jennifer Capriati
  Pam Casale
  Jelena Dokić
  Sara Errani
  Mary Joe Fernandez
  Tatiana Golovin
  Daniela Hantuchová
  Martina Hingis
  Anke Huber
  Jamea Jackson
  Jelena Janković
  Anna Kournikova
  Michelle Larcher de Brito

  Sabine Lisicki
  Mirjana Lučić
  Iva Majoli
  Tara Moore
  Mary Pierce
  Raffaella Reggi
  Monica Seles
  Maria Sharapova
  Alexandra Stevenson
  Nicole Vaidišová
  Caroline Vis
  Heather Watson
  Serena Williams
  Venus Williams
  Fabiola Zuluaga

Soccer

 Eddie Ababio
 Faris Abdi
 Freddy Adu
 Nelson Akwari
 Kevin Alston
 Jozy Altidore
 Bernardo Añor
 Bryan Arguez
 Corey Ashe
 Eric Avila
 DaMarcus Beasley
 Kyle Beckerman
 Nikolas Besagno
 Zak Boggs
 Carlos Borja
 Jonathan Bornstein
 Michael Bradley
 Brian Brooks
 Craig Capano
 Casey Castle
 Jordan Cila
 Matt Clare

 Bobby Convey
 Steve Cronin
 Steven Curfman
 Kenny Cutler
 Matthew Dallman
 Kyle Davies
 Justin Detter
 John DiRaimondo
 Landon Donovan
 Greg Eckhardt
 Ben Everson
 Gabriel Farfan
 Michael Farfan
 Brian Fekete
 Evan Finney
 Eddie Gaven
 Guillermo Gonzalez
 Adolfo Gregorio
 Joseph Gyau
 Happy Hall
 Jeremy Hall
 Michael Harrington
 Kyle Helton
 Cameron Hepple
 Martin Hutton
 Christian Ibeagha
 Amaechi Igwe
 Stefan Jerome
 Christian Jimenez
 Aron Jóhannsson
 Eddie Johnson
 Quavas Kirk
 Perry Kitchen
 Nick Kolarac
 Asa Kryst
 Josh Lambo
 Chris Lancos
 Eric Lichaj
 Zac MacMath
 Mike Magee
 Taurean Manders
 Laurent Manuel
 Justin Mapp
 Peri Marošević
 Jamie McGuinness
 Jack McInerney
 Devon McKenney
 Ellis McLoughlin
 Tommy Meyer
 Chase Miller
 Nick Millington
 Javed Mohammed
 Steven Morris
 Kyle Nakazawa
 Oguchi Onyewu
 Emilio Orozco
 Matt Orr
 Heath Pearce
 Brian Perk
 Jacob Peterson
 Tyler Polak
 Santino Quaranta
 Charlie Reiter
 Diego Restrepo
 Robbie Rogers
 Soony Saad
 Kofi Sarkodie
 Jordan Seabrook
 Brek Shea
 Brian Span
 Jonathan Spector
 Eugene Starikov
 Michael Stephens
 Jordan Stone
 Danny Szetela
 Neven Subotic
 Ryan Thompson
 Sébastien Thurière
 Joseph Toby
 Erika Tymrak
 Kirk Urso
 Julian Valentin
 Indiana Vassilev
 Korey Veeder
 Marco Vélez
 Blake Wagner
 Anthony Wallace
 Jamie Watson
 Chase Wileman
 Sheanon Williams
 Tanner Wolfe
 Leland Wright
 Drew Yates
 Alex Yi
 Eriq Zavaleta
 Preston Zimmerman

References

External links
IMG Academy's official site

Img Academy
IMG Academy alumni